Elections were held in the state of Western Australia on 26 March 1927 to elect all 50 members to the Legislative Assembly. The incumbent Labor Party government, led by Premier Philip Collier, won a second term in government against the United-Country opposition, led by Opposition Leader James Mitchell.

Results 

|}

 210,949 electors were enrolled to vote at the election, but 9 of the 50 seats were uncontested, with 16,862 electors enrolled in those seats. All 9 of these seats were held by Labor.

 The United Party operated as a combination of the Nationalist Party and the Majority Country Party from the previous election.  In 1923, the Country Party had split into Majority and Executive factions.

See also
 Members of the Western Australian Legislative Assembly, 1924–1927
 Members of the Western Australian Legislative Assembly, 1927–1930
 First Collier Ministry

References

Elections in Western Australia
1927 elections in Australia
1920s in Western Australia
March 1927 events